Dalton Crossan (born February 25, 1994) is an American football running back. He played college football at  New Hampshire and was signed by the Indianapolis Colts as an undrafted free agent in 2017.

Early years
Crossan began his athletic career at Shoreham-Wading River High School in Shoreham, New York. He later attended Sachem High School North in Lake Ronkonkoma, New York. He received the Hansen Award as the best player on Long Island. He also played lacrosse and received offers to play lacrosse at Notre Dame and the University of Michigan.

College career
Crossan played college football at the University of New Hampshire from 2012 to 2016. He appeared in 44 games and totaled 5,189 all-purpose yards, including 2,617 rushing yards, 779 receiving yards, and 1,793 kick return yards. In 2016, he rushed for 1,281 yards and 10 touchdowns and totaled 1,977 all-purpose yards.

Professional career

Indianapolis Colts
Crossan was signed by the Indianapolis Colts as an undrafted free agent on May 4, 2017. He was waived/injured by the Colts on August 15, 2017 and was placed on injured reserve. He was released on August 22, 2017.

Tampa Bay Buccaneers
On February 22, 2018, Crossan was signed by the Tampa Bay Buccaneers. He was waived/injured on August 2, 2018 and placed on injured reserve. He was released on August 10, 2018.

References

External links
 Tampa Bay Buccaneers bio
 Indianapolis Colts bio

1994 births
Living people
Players of American football from New York (state)
People from Stony Brook, New York
American football running backs
New Hampshire Wildcats football players
Indianapolis Colts players
Tampa Bay Buccaneers players